Talking Tom & Friends is a computer-animated children's web series by Outfit7 Limited, based on the media franchise of the same name. The first three seasons of the show were produced by the Austrian animation-studio ARX Anima. Starting from season 4, the show has been produced by the Spanish animation studio People Moving Pixels. It was released on YouTube on 30 April 2015. The show has also aired on Boomerang UK since 5 September 2016, with its second season streaming on Netflix in the United States since 2017, and the fifth season currently airing on Pop.

Series overview

Episodes

Pilot (2014)

Season 1 (2015–16)

Season 2 (2017–18)

Season 3 (2018)

Season 4 (2019–20)

Season 5 (2020–21)

Minisodes (2015–16)

References 

Talking Tom and Friends
Talking Tom & Friends